A pea-picker is a derogatory reference to poor, migrant workers during the Great Depression.  These people were unskilled, poorly educated workers, employable only in menial jobs, such as harvesting crops and, as such, received poor wages for working long hours under dreadful conditions.  Some of these people were photographed by Dorothea Lange.

The term "pea picker" is used to distinguish a group as a lower social class from some other similar group, such as the "pea-picking" Smiths, as opposed to the "respectable" Smiths. Temporary communities of pea-pickers are called pea picker camps and farms that employed them were pea-picker farms.

Dust Bowl migrants 

During the Great Depression, the American government, without due process, deported between 1 and 2 million American citizens and legal residents of Mexican descent. This mass deportation, known as the Mexican Repatriation, took place from 1929 to 1939 and was empowered by panic of an alarmingly high unemployment rate sweeping over the United States at this time. The Dust Bowl was the name given to the Great Plains region devastated by drought in 1930s depression-ridden America. This triggered the migration of men, women, and children seeking work, food, and shelter making their way to California, hoping to find opportunity and a better life. Most of the migrants moving west were not farmers, having lived either in a town or city doing some kind of blue-collar work. They headed west unaware of the poor living conditions and only seasonal work that largely depended on the weather. The Midwesterners impacted by both the Depression and Dust Bowl packed up their families and relocated in hopes of finding a chance at the American dream, having realized that the drought and dust storms would not end anytime soon. Some sold what they could not bring along and began to drive west on Route 66. The term pea-picker was used to describe these particular group migrant workers in a negative context. The workers who picked these peas before the Dust Bowl migration and Mexican Repatriation had taken place were mostly Mexicans, Filipinos, and single white males before the Depression. This new work force of unskilled migrant families from the Dust Bowl now took their place and helped coin the term pea-pickers.

See also

Okie 
 Tennessee Ernie Ford, who was nicknamed "The Ol' Pea-Picker Himself"
 White trash
 The Grapes of Wrath

References

External links 

  Schwinn "Peapicker"

Great Depression in the United States
Agricultural labor